Zamania  railway station (station code ZNA) is an important railway station located in Zamania, Ghazipur district in the Indian state of Uttar Pradesh.

Trains 
1. 13007/08 Howrah-Sriganganagar-Howarh Udyan Abha Toofan Express
2. 13133/34 Varanasi-Sealdah UpperIndia Express (Varanasi Express)
3. 20801/02 Islampur-NewDelhi Magadh Superfast Express
4. 12141/42 Mumbai LTT-Patliputra Superfast Express
5. 13237/38 Patna–Kota Express(Via-Ayodhya Cantt)
6. 13119/20 Sealdah-Old Delhi Upper India Express
7. 13413/14 Malda Town-Old Delhi Farakka Express (via Sultanpur)
8. 13483/84 Malda Town-Old Delhi Farakka Express
9. 13239/40 Patna-Kota Express (Via-Sultanpur)
10. 12333/34 Howrah-Prayagraj Rambagh Vibhuti Superfast Express
11. 13005/06 Howrah-Amritsar Mail(Punjab Mail)
12. 13049/50 Howrah-Amritsar Express (Banaras Express)
13. 13201/02 Patna-Mumbai LTT Janta Express
14.

See also

 Northern Railway zone
 Babrala

References 

Railway stations in Agra district